Philip Bryant (born 27 March 1974) is an Australian swimmer. He competed in the men's 400 metre individual medley at the 1992 Summer Olympics.

References

External links
 

1974 births
Living people
Australian male medley swimmers
Olympic swimmers of Australia
Swimmers at the 1992 Summer Olympics
Swimmers from Sydney
Commonwealth Games medallists in swimming
Commonwealth Games bronze medallists for Australia
Swimmers at the 1994 Commonwealth Games
20th-century Australian people
Medallists at the 1994 Commonwealth Games